The United States Department of Veterans Affairs (VA) is a Cabinet-level executive branch department of the federal government charged with providing life-long healthcare services to eligible military veterans at the 170 VA medical centers and outpatient clinics located throughout the country. Non-healthcare benefits include disability compensation, vocational rehabilitation, education assistance, home loans, and life insurance. The VA also provides burial and memorial benefits to eligible veterans and family members at 135 national cemeteries.

While veterans' benefits have been provided by the federal government since the American Revolutionary War, a veteran-specific federal agency was not established until 1930, as the Veterans Administration. In 1982, its mission was extended to a fourth mission to provide care to non-veterans and civilians in case of national emergencies. In 1989, the Veterans Administration became a cabinet-level Department of Veterans Affairs. The agency is led by the Secretary of Veterans Affairs, who, being a cabinet member, is appointed by the President.

 the VA employs 412,892 people at hundreds of Veterans Affairs medical facilities, clinics, benefits offices, and cemeteries. In Fiscal Year 2016 net program costs for the department were $273 billion, which includes the VBA Actuarial Cost of $106.5 billion for compensation benefits. The long-term "actuarial accrued liability" (total estimated future payments for veterans and their family members) is $2.491 trillion for compensation benefits; $59.6 billion for education benefits; and $4.6 billion for burial benefits.

History
The history and evolution of the U.S. Department of Veterans Affairs is inextricably intertwined and dependent on the history of America's wars, as wounded soldiers are the population the VA cares for. The list of wars involving the United States from the American Revolutionary War to the present totals ninety nine wars. The majority of the United States military casualties of war, however, occurred in the following eight wars: American Revolutionary War (est. 8000), American Civil War (218,222), World War I (53,402), World War II (291,567), Korean War (33,686), Vietnam War (47,424), Iraq War (3,836), War in Afghanistan (1,833). It is these wars that have primarily driven the mission and evolution of the VA. The VA maintains a detailed list of war wounded as it is the population that comprises the VA care system.

Origins
The Continental Congress of 1776 encouraged enlistments during the American Revolutionary War by providing pensions for soldiers who were disabled. Direct medical and hospital care given to veterans in the early days of the U.S. was provided by the individual states and communities. In 1811, the first domiciliary and medical facility for veterans was authorized by the federal government, but not opened until 1834. In the 19th century, the nation's veterans assistance program was expanded to include benefits and pensions not only for veterans, but also their widows and dependents.

After the end of the American Civil War in 1865, many state veterans' homes were established. Since domiciliary care was available at all state veterans homes, incidental medical and hospital treatment was provided for all injuries and diseases, whether or not of service origin. Indigent and disabled veterans of the Civil War, Indian Wars, Spanish–American War, and Mexican Border period as well as discharged regular members of the Armed Forces were cared for at these homes.

During this period two of the three predecessors of the Veterans Administration were established: the Bureau of Pensions in 1832, and the National Home for Disabled Volunteer Soldiers in 1865.

Consolidation into Veterans Administration
Congress established a new system of veterans benefits when the United States entered World War I in 1917. Included were programs for disability compensation, insurance for service persons and veterans, and vocational rehabilitation for the disabled. The Veterans Bureau was established in August 1921, absorbing the War Risk Bureau and the Rehabilitation Division of the Federal Board for Vocational Education. In 1922, it gained a large number of veterans' hospital facilities from the Public Health Service, most of which had been recently established on former U.S. Army bases.

By the 1920s, the various benefits were administered by three different federal agencies: the Veterans Bureau, the Bureau of Pensions, and the National Home for Disabled Volunteer Soldiers. The establishment of the Veterans Administration came in 1930 when Congress authorized the president to "consolidate and coordinate Government activities affecting war veterans". The three component agencies became bureaus within the Veterans Administration. Brigadier General Frank T. Hines, who directed the Veterans Bureau for seven years, was named as the first Administrator of Veterans Affairs, a job he held until 1945.

World War II
The close of World War II resulted in not only a vast increase in the veteran population, but also a large number of new benefits enacted by Congress for veterans of the war. In addition, during the late 1940s, the VA had to contend with aging World War I veterans. During that time, "the clientele of the VA increased almost five fold with an addition of nearly 16,000,000 World War II veterans and approximately 4,000,000 World War I veterans." Prior to World War II, in response to scandals at the Veterans Bureau, programs that cared for veterans were centralized in Washington, D.C. This centralization caused delays and bottlenecks as the agency tried to serve the World War II veterans. As a result, the VA went through a decentralization process, giving more authority to the field offices.

The World War II GI Bill was signed into law on 22 June 1944, by President Franklin D. Roosevelt. "The United States government began serious consolidated services to veterans in 1930. The GI Bill of Rights, which was passed in 1944, had more effect on the American way of life than any other legislation – with the possible exception of the Homestead Act."

Further educational assistance acts were passed for the benefit of veterans of the Korean War.

Promotion to Department of Veterans Affairs
The Department of Veterans Affairs Act of 1988 changed the former Veterans Administration, an independent government agency established in 1930 into a Cabinet-level Department of Veterans Affairs. It was signed into law by President Ronald Reagan on 25 October 1988, however came into effect under the term of his successor, George H. W. Bush, on 15 March 1989.

The reform period 1995–2000 saw the Veterans Health Administration (VHA) dramatically improve care access, quality, and efficiency. This was through leveraging its national integrated electronic health information system (VistA), and in so doing implemented universal primary care, increased patients treated by 24%, had a 48% increase in ambulatory care visits, and decreased staffing by 12%. By 2000, the VHA had 10,000 fewer employees than in 1995 and a 104% increase in patients treated since 1995, and had managed to maintain the same cost per patient-day, while all other facilities' costs had risen over 30% to 40% during the same period.

The 2008 "New GI Bill" (Post-9/11 Veterans Educational Assistance Act of 2008) authored by Sen. Jim Webb (D-VA) doubled GI Bill college benefits while providing a 13-week extension to federal unemployment benefits. The new GI Bill more than doubled the value of the benefit to roughly $90,000 up from $40,000. In-state public universities essentially are covered to provide full scholarships for veterans under the new education package. For those veterans who served at least three years a monthly housing stipend was also added to the law. Congress and President Barack Obama extended the new GI Bill in August 2009 at the cost of roughly $70 billion over the next decade. The Department of Defense (DoD) allows individuals who, on or after 1 August 2009, have served at least six years in the Armed Forces and who agree to serve at least another four years in the U.S. Armed Forces to transfer unused entitlement to their surviving spouse. Servicemembers reaching 10-year anniversaries could choose to transfer the benefit to any dependents such as their spouse or children.

In May 2014, critics of the VA system reported problems with scheduling timely access to medical care. In May 2014, a retired doctor said that veterans died because of delays getting care at the Phoenix, Arizona Veterans Health Administration facilities. An investigation of delays in treatment in the Veterans Health Administration system was conducted by the Veterans Affairs Inspector General of 3,409 veteran patients found that there were 28 instances of clinically significant delays in care associated with access or scheduling. Of these 28 patients, 6 were deceased. The same OIG report stated that the Office of Investigations had opened investigations at 93 sites of care in response to allegations of wait time manipulations, and found that wait time manipulations were prevalent throughout VHA. On 30 May 2014, Secretary of Veterans Affairs Eric Shinseki resigned from office due to the fallout from the scandal, saying he could not explain the lack of integrity among some leaders in VA healthcare facilities. "That breach of integrity is irresponsible, it is indefensible, and unacceptable to me. I said when this situation began weeks to months ago that I thought the problem was limited and isolated because I believed that. I no longer believe it. It is systemic. I was too trusting of some and I accepted as accurate reports that I now know to have been misleading with regard to patient wait-times," Shinseki said in a statement.

In September 2017, the VA declared its intent to abolish a 1960s conflict of interest rule prohibiting employees from owning stock in, performing service for, or doing any work at for-profit colleges; arguing that, for example, the 1960s rule prohibits VA doctors from teaching veterans at for-profit universities with special advantages for veterans. In 2018, the VA instead established a process for employees to seek waivers of the policy based on individual circumstances.

In 2023, a new mission statement was announced for the VA; it is, “To fulfill President Lincoln’s promise to care for those who have served in our nation’s military and for their families, caregivers, and survivors.” The VA’s previous mission statement, established in 1959, was, “To fulfill President Lincoln’s promise ‘to care for him who shall have borne the battle, and for his widow, and his orphan’ by serving and honoring the men and women who are America’s veterans.”

Functions
The VA's primary function is to support veterans in their time after service by providing benefits and support.

Providing care for non-veteran civilian or military patients in case hospitals overflow in a crisis was added as role by Congress in 1982, and became known as the VA's "fourth mission" (besides the three missions of serving veterans through care, research and training). It can provide medical services (reimbursed from other federal agencies) to the general public for major disasters and emergencies declared by the President of the United States, and when the Secretary of Health and Human Services activates the National Disaster Medical System. During disasters and health emergencies, requests for VA assistance are made by state governors to the Federal Emergency Management Agency or the Department of Health and Human Services, which then relay approved requests to the VA. The VA is also allowed to provide paid medical care on an emergency basis to non-veterans. On March 27, 2020, the VA made public its COVID-19 response plan within its medical facilities to protect veterans, their families and staff.

One initiative in the department is to prevent and end veterans' homelessness. The VA works with the United States Interagency Council on Homelessness to address these issues. The USICH identified ending veterans' homelessness by 2015 as a primary goal in its proposal Opening Doors: Federal Strategic Plan to Prevent and End Homelessness, released in 2010; amendments to the 2010 version made in 2015 include a preface written by U.S. Secretary of Labor Thomas E. Perez that cites a 33% reduction in veteran homelessness since the creation of the Opening Doors initiative. The prominent role of the Department of Veterans Affairs and its joined up approach to veteran welfare are such that they have been deemed to distinguish the US response to veteran homelessness internationally.

Organization
The Department of Veterans Affairs is headed by the Secretary of Veterans Affairs, appointed by the President with the advice and consent of the Senate.

The Secretary of Veterans Affairs is Denis McDonough who was selected by President Joe Biden and sworn in by Vice President Kamala Harris on 9 February 2021. The Deputy Secretary of Veterans Affairs position is currently vacant with the retirement of Thomas G. Bowman on 15 June 2018. The third listed executive on the VA's official web site is its Chief of Staff (currently Pamela J. Powers); the Chief of Staff position does not require Senate confirmation. In addition to Secretary and Deputy Secretary, the VA has ten more positions requiring presidential appointment and Senate approval.

The department has three main subdivisions, known as administrations, each headed by an undersecretary:

Veterans Health Administration (VHA): responsible for providing health care in all its forms, as well as for biomedical research (under the Office of Research and Development), Community Based Outpatient Clinics (CBOCs), Regional Medical Centers (VAMC), and Readjustment Counseling Services (RCS) Vet Centers.
Veterans Benefits Administration (VBA): responsible for initial veteran registration, eligibility determination, and five key lines of business (benefits and entitlements): Home Loan Guarantee, Insurance, Vocational Rehabilitation and Employment, Education (GI Bill), and Compensation & Pension
National Cemetery Administration: responsible for providing burial and memorial benefits, as well as for maintenance of VA cemeteries

There are Assistant Secretaries of Veteran Affairs for: Congressional and Legislative Affairs; Policy and Planning; Human Resources and Administration; and Operations, Security and Preparedness. Other Senate-approved presidential nominees at the VA include: Chief Financial Officer; Chairman of the Board of Veterans' Appeals; General Counsel; and Inspector General.

The VA employs 377,805 people, of which 338,205 are nonseasonal full-time employees. The American Federation of Government Employees represents 230,000 VA employees, with VA matters addressed in detail by the National VA Council.

Veterans Benefits Administration

The VA, through its Veterans Benefits Administration (VBA), provides a variety of services for veterans including disability compensation, pension, education, home loans, life insurance, vocational, rehabilitation, survivors' benefits, health care, and burial benefits.

The Department of Labor (DOL) provides job development and job training opportunities for disabled and other veterans through contacts with employers and local agencies.

National Cemetery Administration

In 1973, the Veterans Administration assumed another major responsibility when the National Cemetery System (NCS) (except for Arlington National Cemetery) was transferred to the Veterans Administration from the Department of the Army. Public Law 93-43, National Cemeteries Act of 1973.

In 1978, Congress established the State Cemetery Grants Program (Public Law 95-476). This act is administered by the National Cemetery Administration to aid States and U.S. territories in the establishment, expansion and improvement of veterans cemeteries. The VA was charged with the operation of the NCS, including the marking of graves of all persons in national and State cemeteries (and the graves of veterans in private cemeteries, upon request) as well and administering the State Cemetery Grants Program. The VA's National Cemetery Administration maintains 131 national cemeteries in 39 states (and Puerto Rico) as well as 33 soldiers' lots and monument sites.

The Department of the Army maintains two national cemeteries, the Arlington National Cemetery and the U.S. Soldiers' & Airmen's Home National Cemetery. Many states have established state veterans cemeteries. The American Battle Monuments Commission maintains 25 overseas military cemeteries that serve as resting places for almost 125,000 American war dead; on Tablets of the Missing that memorialize more than 94,000 U.S. servicemen and women; and through 25 memorials, monuments and markers. Fourteen national cemeteries are maintained by the National Park Service.

Center for Women Veterans
The Center for Women Veterans (CWA) was established within the Department of Veterans Affairs by Public Law 103-446 in November 1994. The Center's mission is to:

Monitor and coordinate the VA's delivery of health care, benefits, and programs for women veterans
Advocate for cultural transformation (within VA and in the general public) in recognizing the service and contributions of women veterans and women in the military
Raise awareness of the responsibility to treat women veterans with dignity and respect.

Center for Women Veterans activities include monitoring and coordinating delivery of benefits and services to women veterans; coordinating with Federal, state, and local agencies and organizations and non-government partners which serve women veterans; serving as a resource and referral center for women veterans, their families, and their advocates; educating VA staff on women' military contributions; ensuring that outreach materials portray and target women veterans; promoting recognition of women veterans' service with activities and special events; and coordinating meetings of the Advisory Committee on Women Veterans. CWA has held summits and forums for female veterans and created social media campaigns and exhibits to highlight women's military service. CWA offers a Women Veterans Call Center (1-855-829-6636) to assist female U.S. military veterans with VA services and resources. In 2018, the Center for Women Veterans launched the "I Am Not Invisible" photography project, featuring individual portraits, to highlight and represent the contributions, needs, and experiences of America's two million women veterans.

Costs for care
The VA categorizes veterans into eight priority groups and several additional subgroups, based on factors such as service-connected disabilities, and their income and assets (adjusted to local cost of living).

Veterans with a 50% or higher service-connected disability as determined by a VA regional office "rating board" (e.g., losing a limb in battle, PTSD, etc.) are provided comprehensive care and medication at no charge. Veterans with lesser qualifying factors who exceed a pre-defined income threshold have to make co-payments for care for non-service-connected ailments and prescription medication. VA dental and nursing home care benefits are more restricted.

Reservists and National Guard personnel who served stateside in peacetime settings or have no service-related disabilities generally do not qualify for VA health benefits.

The VA's budget has been pushed to the limit in recent years by the War on Terrorism. In December 2004, it was widely reported that VA's funding crisis had become so severe that it could no longer provide disability ratings to veterans in a timely fashion. This is a problem because until veterans are fully transitioned from the active-duty TRICARE healthcare system to VA, they are on their own with regard to many healthcare costs.

The VA's backlog of pending disability claims under review (a process known as "adjudication") peaked at 421,000 in 2001, and bottomed out at 254,000 in 2003, but crept back up to 340,000 in 2005. 
Today's backlog numbers are much lower at 69,626. These numbers are released every Monday.
No copayment is required for VA services for veterans with military-related medical conditions. VA-recognized service-connected disabilities include problems that started or were aggravated due to military service. Veteran service organizations such as the American Legion, Veterans of Foreign Wars, and Disabled American Veterans, as well as state-operated Veterans Affairs offices and County Veteran Service Officers (CVSO), have been known to assist veterans in the process of getting care from the VA.

In his budget proposal for fiscal year 2009, President George W. Bush requested $38.7 billion—or 86.5% of the total Veterans Affairs budget—for veteran medical care alone.

In the 2011 Costs of War report from Brown University, researchers projected that the cost of caring for veterans of the War on Terror would peak 30–40 years after the end of combat operations. They also predicted that medical and disability costs would ultimately total between $600 billion and $1 trillion for the hundreds of thousands treated by the Department of Veterans Affairs.

Freedom of Information Act processing performance
In a 2015 Center for Effective Government analysis of 15 federal agencies which receive the most Freedom of Information Act (United States) (FOIA) requests (using 2012 and 2013 data, the most recent years available), the VA earned a D by scoring 64 out of a possible 100 points, i.e. did not earn a satisfactory overall grade, for facilitating FOIA requests.

Related legislation
1944: Mustering-out Payment Act PL 78-225
1944: Servicemen's Readjustment Act PL 78-346
1944: Veterans' Preference Act PL 78-359
1952: Veterans' Readjustment Assistance Act PL 82-550
1974: Vietnam Veterans' Readjustment Assistance Act
1988: Department of Veterans Affairs Act PL 100-527
2006: Veterans Benefits, Health Care, and Information Technology Act of 2006 PL 109-461
2013: FOR VETS Act of 2013 
2013: Veterans Paralympic Act of 2013 (H.R. 1402; 113th Congress) 
2014: Veterans Access, Choice, and Accountability Act of 2014 (H.R. 3230; 113th Congress) 
2017: Veterans Appeals Improvement and Modernization Act of 2017

Proposed
2013: To establish a commission or task force to evaluate the backlog of disability claims of the Department of Veterans Affairs (H.R. 2189; 113th Congress)
2013: Demanding Accountability for Veterans Act of 2013 (H.R. 2072; 113th Congress)
2014: Department of Veterans Affairs Management Accountability Act of 2014 (H.R. 4031; 113th Congress)

See also

Department of Veterans Affairs Under Secretary's Award in Health Services Research
EBenefits
Independent Living Program
Supportive Services for Veteran Families (SSVF)
United States Department of Veterans Affairs Police
Veterans Health Information Systems and Technology Architecture (VistA)

Notes and references

External links

Department of Veterans Affairs on USAspending.gov
Department of Veterans Affairs in the Federal Register
VA-Office of Inspector General

United States Department of Veterans Affairs
1989 establishments in Washington, D.C.
Government agencies established in 1989
Veterans
Veterans' affairs ministries
Veterans' affairs in the United States
Hospital networks in the United States